North Carolina Highway 411 (NC 411) is a  primary state highway in the U.S. state of North Carolina. The  route connects the towns of Harrells, Garland, and Roseboro, entirely in Sampson County.

Route description
NC 411's western terminus is at NC 242 south near Roseboro, NC 411 travels southwest and meets a junction with US 701 before it reaches Garland, after NC 411 leaves Garland, it meets a junction with the southern terminus of NC 903 and goes with the street name Harrells Highway traveling rural Sampson County, when NC 411 hits NC 41, they travel east together until they hit US 421 in Harrells.

History
NC 411 was first commissioned in 1937, starting as a short route between Harrells and Garland. Its eastern terminus was at the former alignment of NC 41 and the western terminus was at US 701. In the early 1950s the routing of NC 411 was extended and altered slightly to its current alignment.

Junction list

References

External links

NCRoads.com: N.C. 411

411
Transportation in Sampson County, North Carolina